Henri Julien Allard (12 June 1803 – 17 November 1882) was a Belgian politician. He was a member of the Chamber of Representatives.

References
 H. HYMANS, Histoire parlementaire de la Belgique de 1831 à 1880, Brussels, 1877-1880
 Maurice A. ARNOULD, Henri Julien Allard, in: Biographie nationale de Belgique, T. XXIX, Brussels, 1956
 Jean-Luc DE PAEPE & Christiane RAINDORF-GERARD (red), Le Parlement Belge 1831-1894. Données Biographiques, Brussels, Académie Royale de Belgique, 1996

Members of the Chamber of Representatives (Belgium)
1803 births
1882 deaths
Place of birth missing